La Estrella is a 2013 Spanish comedy-tinged drama film directed by Alberto Aranda (in his feature debut) based on the novel by . It stars Ingrid Rubio as the title character alongside Carmen Machi, Marc Clotet, and Fele Martínez.

Plot 
Set in Santa Coloma de Gramenet and featuring the backdrop of gender violence, the plot follows the vicissitudes of Estrella, a good-willed and joyful woman (with her boyfriend Salva and her best friend Trini around). She takes over the reins of her life in a search for happiness.

Cast

Production 
Written by Alberto Aranda and Belén Carmona, the film is based on the novel of the same name by Belén Carmona. It was primarily shot in Santa Coloma de Gramenet (specifically in Les Oliveres neighborhood).

Release 
The film was presented in the 'Malaga Premiere' section of the 16th Málaga Film Festival in April 2013. Distributed by Splendor Films, the film was theatrically released in Spain on 24 May 2013.

Reception 
Mariló García of Cinemanía rated the film 2 out of 5 stars, deeming it to be "tedious in its execution and presumable in its development", concluding that "not even Ingrid Rubio's luminous smile manages to captivate us".

Javier Ocaña of El País noted the discrete yields reaped by the film, in which authenticity only appears in dribs and drabs.

Toni Vall of Ara rated the film 2 out of 5 stars, praising the "tireless struggle [by Aranda] to project light and filmic truth" to a story that has however "been explained to us a thousand and one times before".

Accolades 

|-
| rowspan = "3" align = "center" | 2014 || rowspan = "2" | 6th Gaudí Awards || Best Actress || Ingrid Rubio ||  || rowspan = "2" | 
|-
| Best Supporting Actress || Carmen Machi || 
|-
| 23rd Actors and Actresses Union Awards || Best Film Actress in a Leading Role || Ingrid Rubio ||  || align = "center" | 
|}

See also 
 List of Spanish films of 2013

References 

Spanish comedy-drama films
2013 comedy-drama films
2010s Spanish films
2010s Spanish-language films
Films shot in the province of Barcelona
Films set in Catalonia
Films based on Spanish novels
2013 directorial debut films